My Haunted is the eighth album by Lackthereof, a solo project of Danny Seim, a founding member of Menomena.

Track listing
 "It's Over" – 2:40
 "Away, Away" – 3:46
 "Every Kind Word" – 1:42
 "Fate" – 1:51
 "Gong Song" – 1:51
 "Holywater" – 1:21
 "Both of Us" – 5:21
 "Jaw" – 2:49
 "Blazing Lights" – 1:35
 "Century" – 2:21
 "The Columbia" – 3:37
 "Shortest Path to the Ground" – 2:07
 "Wooden Spine" – 2:46

References

Lackthereof albums
2008 albums